Charles Korede Ayo is a Nigerian academic, administrator and former vice-chancellor of the Covenant University. Prior to succeeding Aize Obayan as Vice Chancellor, he was the head of the Department of Computer and Information Sciences. He is also involved in research on computer and communications topics, such as electronic commerce and mobile computing. Ayo has placed emphasis on leadership training at Covenant University, as well as on academic performance and "Godly standards." He seeks to make Covenant University "one of the top 10 universities in the world" within a decade.

He was the best graduating student in Computer Science at Ahmadu Bello University in 1984. Ayo has a Ph.D. in Numerical Computation from the University of Ilorin. Prior to joining Covenant, he taught at Lagos State University. He is married with four children.

In 2017, Ayo delivered the keynote speech on Restructuring the higher education delivery for human capital development and national transformation at the convocation ceremony for Crawford University.

References 

Living people
Academic staff of Lagos State University
University of Ilorin alumni
Ahmadu Bello University alumni
Academic staff of Covenant University
1958 births